Moses Kiprono arap Keino (September, 1937 – November 4, 1998) was Speaker of the Parliament of Kenya from 1988 until 1991.

Education and early life
Between 1962 and 1967, Keino attended Hochschule fur Ökonomie (University of Economics), Karlhorst, East Berlin, Germany and graduated with a Masters in Economics.

Political career
Moses Kiprono arap Keino served as a Member of Parliament representing Kericho East Constituency for 15 years on a KANU ticket [1969 – 1983]. 
On the hindsight of a long parliamentary service stretching to the Second Parliament, he had served on several Standing and ad hoc Select Committees; and both as Deputy Chief Whip and Deputy Speaker. As the Deputy Speaker of the Fourth Parliament his tenure was cut short by his resignation on June 20, 1983 .

On 12 April 1988 Moses Kiprono arap Keino was elected unopposed as the Speaker of the Parliament of Kenya KANU and served till June 11, 1991 .

Moses Kiprono arap Keino later crossed over to the Opposition [FORD] and fought for Multi-Party Politics in Kenya until the then President Daniel arap Moi allowed it in the 1992 elections.

FORD was split into two factions namely; Ford-Asili under Kenneth Matiba and Forum for the Restoration of Democracy–Kenya under the late Jaramogi Oginga Odinga father of the former Prime Minister of Kenya Hon. Raila Odinga. In 1992, he contested the Kipkelion Constituency parliamentary seat which was considered a KANU zone under FORD-KENYA.

Death 
Moses Kiprono arap Keino died November 4, 1998 and was buried at his  Sorget farm in Londiani, Kericho.

See also 
 Speaker of the National Assembly of Kenya

References

 Parliament Of Kenya: History & Development; A Brief History
 Politics and Parliamentarians in Kenya 1944–2007

Speakers of the National Assembly of Kenya
1937 births
1998 deaths
Kenya African National Union politicians
Forum for the Restoration of Democracy – Kenya politicians